Krzymów may refer to the following places:
Krzymów, Greater Poland Voivodeship (west-central Poland)
Krzymów, Masovian Voivodeship (east-central Poland)
Krzymów, West Pomeranian Voivodeship (north-west Poland)